1st Rozhdestvenskoye or Pervoye Rozhdestvenskoye is a rural locality in Verkhnekhotemlsky Selsoviet Rural Settlement, Fatezhsky District, Kursk Oblast, Russia. Population:

Geography 
The village is located on the right bank of the Verkhny Khoteml Brook (a link tributary of the Usozha in the basin of the Svapa), 101 km from the Russia–Ukraine border, 38 km north-west of Kursk, 7.5 km (10 km by road) south of the district center – the town Fatezh, 1 km from the selsoviet center – Verkhny Khoteml.

 Climate
1st Rozhdestvenskoye has a warm-summer humid continental climate (Dfb in the Köppen climate classification).

History 
During the Great Patriotic War, a hospital was organized inside the village school. In 1965, the village of Dolgintsevo was added to the village.

Famous people 
 Yevgeny Samodurov (born in 1st Rojdenstvenskoe in 1925), a Red Army radio operator who was awarded the Order of Glory for his actions on the Ukrainian Front during World War II.

Transport 
1st Rozhdestvenskoye is located 2.5 km from the federal route  Crimea Highway as part of the European route E105, 29 km from the road of regional importance  (Kursk – Ponyri), 4 km from the road  (Fatezh – 38K-018), 0.5 km from the road of intermunicipal significance  (M2 "Crimea Highway" – Verkhny Khoteml), 33.5 km from the nearest railway halt Bukreyevka (railway line Oryol – Kursk).

The rural locality is situated 40 km from Kursk Vostochny Airport, 159 km from Belgorod International Airport and 231 km from Voronezh Peter the Great Airport.

External links 
 1st Rojdenstvenskoe on streetvi.ru

References

Notes

Sources

Rural localities in Fatezhsky District
Fatezhsky Uyezd